Norman Park is a city in Colquitt County, Georgia, United States. The population was 972 at the 2010 census.

History
The Georgia General Assembly incorporated Norman Park as a town in 1902. The community was named after J.B. Norman, a founder of the local but now-defunct Norman College.

Geography
Norman Park is located at  (31.271075, -83.684196).

Demographics

As of the census of 2000, there were 849 people, 328 households, and 246 families residing in the city. The racial makeup of the city was 76.09% White, 20.38% African American, 0.94% Native American, 2.12% from other races, and 0.47% from two or more races. Hispanic or Latino of any race were 3.42% of the population.

There were 328 households, out of which 35.4% had children under the age of 18 living with them, 53.0% were married couples living together, 18.9% had a female householder with no husband present, and 24.7% were non-families. 23.2% of all households were made up of individuals, and 9.5% had someone living alone who was 65 years of age or older.  The average household size was 2.59 and the average family size was 3.05.

In the city, the population was spread out, with 28.5% under the age of 18, 7.8% from 18 to 24, 28.0% from 25 to 44, 23.7% from 45 to 64, and 12.0% who were 65 years of age or older.  The median age was 33 years. For every 100 females, there were 88.2 males.  For every 100 females age 18 and over, there were 82.8 males.

The median income for a household in the city was $27,063, and the median income for a family was $31,875. Males had a median income of $27,019 versus $25,982 for females. The per capita income for the city was $13,421.  About 22.8% of families and 22.2% of the population were below the poverty line, including 30.6% of those under age 18 and 24.7% of those age 65 or over.

Education
It is a part of the Colquitt County School District and served by Colquitt County High School.

References

Cities in Georgia (U.S. state)
Cities in Colquitt County, Georgia